The Colne Valley Museum is located within the Colne Valley at Golcar, Huddersfield, West Yorkshire, England. The museum consists of four converted 19th century weavers' cottages. The museum provides an insight into what life was like for a weaver in the early 1850s. The museum includes a clog maker's workshop, a handloom chamber, a spinning room, a cropping room, kitchen and living rooms. The museum is run entirely by voluntary members.

History
The original row of four cottages was built in the 1840s by James and Sally Pearson, who were independent cloth manufacturers. It was built into a steep hillside with a traditional entrance for the lower rooms and a separate entrance to the upper floor at the rear of the cottages. In 1970, three of the cottages were converted to house the museum. They named the cottages 'Spring Rock'.

The museum features several restored period rooms which are also used for temporary exhibits. Permanent exhibits include a handloom and a spinning jenny, invented by James Hargreaves, a weaver's sitting room and 'gas-lit' clogger's shop.

The museum is open for school visits, for which children are encouraged to dress in period clothing, from Monday to Friday. On some weekends, the museum opens for demonstrations and exhibitions by the volunteer helpers, who demonstrate the types of crafts that would have existed during the 19th century.

See also
Colne Valley
Golcar

References

External links

Tourist attractions in Kirklees
Buildings and structures in Kirklees
Colne Valley
Huddersfield
Museums in West Yorkshire
Textile museums in the United Kingdom
Historic house museums in West Yorkshire
Grade II listed buildings in West Yorkshire